Lolawas is a small village southeast of Jodhpur in Jodhpur District of Rajasthan, India.

Per the 2001 census, the number of households in the village stood at 191 with a total population of 1,102 people. 508 were male and 594 were female.

The main population of village is of JAAT .

See also
 [[Dhani and villages] JAT good people of lolawas

References

External links
Censusindia.gov.in
Fallingrain.com
Maps.google.com

Villages in Jodhpur district